Michael David York (born September 6, 1964) is a former professional baseball pitcher. He played parts of two seasons in Major League Baseball for the Pittsburgh Pirates and Cleveland Indians.

Career

York was drafted in 1982 by the New York Yankees, then bounced around the minor leagues for several years before reaching the majors with the Pirates in 1990. After starting 1991 back in the minors, he was traded to the Indians for Mitch Webster on May 16, and pitched in 14 games for Cleveland before once again returning to the minors. He pitched several more years in various minor leagues before retiring in 1998.

References

External links
 

Major League Baseball pitchers
Pittsburgh Pirates players
Cleveland Indians players
Oneonta Yankees players
Gulf Coast White Sox players
Bristol Tigers players
Lakeland Tigers players
Gastonia Tigers players
Macon Pirates players
Salem Buccaneers players
Harrisburg Senators players
Buffalo Bisons (minor league) players
Colorado Springs Sky Sox players
Las Vegas Stars (baseball) players
Syracuse Chiefs players
Tri-City Posse players
Tulsa Drillers players
Oklahoma City 89ers players
Baseball players from Illinois
Sportspeople from Oak Park, Illinois
1964 births
Living people